Angelonia is a genus of about 30 species which occur from Mexico to Argentina and is classified in the Plantaginaceae. They are herbaceous plants occurring mainly in arid and semi-arid habitats. Most Angelonia species can be found in Northeastern Brazil in the Seasonally Dry Tropical Forest namely Caatinga. The flowers of Angelonia are highly specialized for pollination because they have hairs in the inner corolla, which produces oils collected by oil bee pollinators, especially of the genus Centris.

Cultivation 

Some species are cultivated as ornamental plants for their snapdragon-like flowers, but need warm temperatures and large amounts of sunlight.
Garden varieties are mainly cultivars of A. angustifolia.

Species

References

Plantaginaceae
Plantaginaceae genera
Taxa named by Aimé Bonpland
Taxa named by Alexander von Humboldt